Al-Kanemi may refer to:

Abu Ishaq Ibrahim al-Kanemi (d. c. 1212), Arabic poet
Muhammad al-Amin al-Kanemi (1776–1837), Muslim ruler of Borno